A pen is a handheld device used to apply ink to a surface, usually paper, for writing or drawing. Additional types of specialized pens are used in specific types of applications and environments such as in artwork, electronics, digital scanning and spaceflight, and computing.

The following is a list of pen types, brands and/or manufacturing companies of those writing implements. Related items are listed as well.

Types 

 Active
 Ballpoint
 Counter
 Counterfeit banknote detection
 Decoder
 Demonstrator
 Digital
 Dip
 Flex nibs
 Flux
 Fountain
 Fudepen (or "brush pen")
 Gel
 Marker pen, also known as a felt-tip pen
 Connector pen
 Highlighter
 Mean Streak
 Paint
 Permanent
 Qalam
 Quill
 Rastrum
 Reed pen
 Kalamos
 Qalam
 Rollerball
 Ruling
 Skin pens
 Space Pen
 Technical pen

Inventors 
 Alfred Dunhill
 George Safford Parker
 László Bíró 
 Lewis Waterman
 Petrache Poenaru
 Walter A. Sheaffer

Brands

Related topics 

 Ballpoint pen artwork
 Birmingham pen trade
 Calligraphy 
 Classmate Stationery
 Correction fluid
 Crayon
 Four Treasures of the Study
 Grease pencil
 Ink brush
 Ink eraser
 Inkstand
 Inkwell
 Inkstick
 Inkstone
 Invisible ink
 List of artistic media
 List of stationery topics
 List of terms about pen and ink
 List of pen names
 Noctograph
 Oil stick
 Paintbrush
 Pen spinning
 Pencil
 Charcoal pencil
 Graphite
 Mechanical pencil
 PenAgain
 Pen Museum
 Retipping
 Silverpoint
 Slate and stylus
 Stylus
 Writing implement
 Yatate

References

External links
 * 

Pens
Pen manufacturers
pen types